Jeepers Creepers is a 1939 Warner Bros. Looney Tunes animated short directed by Robert Clampett. The short was released on September 23, 1939, and stars Porky Pig.

It was released on DVD on September 19, 2017, in the Porky Pig 101.

Plot 
Porky is a police officer, who is in a police car that is named 6 7/8. He gets a call from his chief to go investigate goings-on at a haunted house. The house is haunted to the core, and the fun loving ghost plays a series of pranks on the unsuspecting pig. As Porky knocks on the door to enter the haunted house, the ghost does a lady voice "Come in." Porky enters, already frightened.

He enters again, the ghost places Frogs into a pair of shoes to look like a person walking, as Porky doesn't notice, the laces of the shoes get stuck to a coat hanger pole then rips off a curtain to make it look like a person with a cloak on. It immediately scares him and then the ghost scares him. Porky runs upstairs and lands in the ghost's arms with realizing, until that famous line comes as the ghost says it very goopy. "What the matter baby?".

Porky is finally scared out of the house, but he has the last laugh when his back-firing car leaves the ghost in blackface (and the surprised ghost doing a Rochester imitation: "My oh my, tattletale grey!").

Reception
Showmen's Trade Review called the short "an unpretentious cartoon that is good for seven minutes of enjoyment... On the whole it will make a welcome addition to any program."

The Film Daily wrote, "Although this type of material has been done so often in animated subjects, Jeepers Creepers carries enough humor to make it worth while for cartoon devotees, and particularly the younger generation of pix-goers."

Cast 
 Mel Blanc – Porky Pig / Ghost and Making Faces / Falsetto (Uncredited)
 Pinto Colvig – one line of Ghost (Uncredited)

References

External links 

1939 films
1939 animated films
1939 comedy films
Looney Tunes shorts
Warner Bros. Cartoons animated short films
Films directed by Bob Clampett
Porky Pig films
American haunted house films
1930s police comedy films
American black-and-white films
1930s Warner Bros. animated short films